Simple Simon may refer to:

"Simple Simon" (nursery rhyme), a nursery rhyme
Simple Simon under knot
the children's game Simon Says, also known as "Simple Simon Says"
Simple Simon (solitaire), a solitaire/patience card game
Simple Simon (1922 film), a British romance film
Simple Simon (musical), a 1930 Broadway musical
Simple Simon (1935 film), a ComiColor Cartoons short film
Simple Simon (novel), a 1996 novel written by Ryne Douglas Pearson on which the 1998 action thriller film Mercury Rising is based.
Simple Simon (2010 film), a Swedish film
Simple Simon (song), 1980 debut single by Australian rock band INXS